This list of bridges in Greece lists bridges of particular historical, scenic, architectural or engineering interest. Road and railway bridges, viaducts, aqueducts and footbridges are included.

Historical and architectural interest bridges

Major road and railway bridges 
This table presents the structures with spans greater than 100 meters (non-exhaustive list).

Notes and references 
 Notes

   Greek monuments database

 

 Others references

See also 

 List of Roman bridges
 List of aqueducts in the Roman Empire
 Transport in Greece
 National Roads and Motorways in Greece
 Rail transport in Greece
 Geography of Greece

External links

Further reading 
 
 
 

Greece
 
Bridges
Bridges